Enga Sign Language is an apparent village sign language among the Tato Enga people in Enga province, Papua New Guinea. It was reported in 1980 in three articles by Adam Kendon, based on ethnographic films of three signers (one deaf, two hearing) in the upper valley of the Lagaip River, but with reports of wider use in the surrounding region. Its current status is unknown, as no more recent information is available.

References

Village sign languages
Sign languages of Papua New Guinea
Home sign
Languages attested from the 1980s